Beangrowers are a Maltese three-piece indie rock band consisting of Alison Galea (vocals and guitar), Mark Sansone (bass guitar) and Ian Schranz (drums and noise). All three were born in 1977 in St. Julian's, Malta. The members of the band are also songwriters, resulting in their albums reflecting diverse influences, including indie rock, punk, and goth.

History
Ian Schranz   (Bark Bark Disco)   and Mark Sansone met in church and were childhood friends from the age of 8, and later started playing music together. They were joined by mutual friend Alison Galea, who proved to be a capable singer. The band went through a number of fourth members before settling on their current three-musician composition. According to the band's official site, the name "Beangrowers" was given by a fan when a promoter demanded a name for posters. According to this story, the band had not previously decided on a name.

Alison, also a guitarist and keyboardist, provides a distinctive and vaguely British-accented voice to Beangrowers songs. Her voice has been described as sweet yet sultry. Drummer Ian Schranz also orchestrates the drum machines and other electronic noise for the songs, while Mark Sansone is the Beangrower's bassist.  Schranz, and his brother, bought what has been described as the oldest bar in Sliema, on a dare, in 2015.  Their gentrification included making it a venue for live music.

The Beangrowers recorded demo tapes in early 1996 when they were just 18. Early recordings featured sounds from 1950s science fiction movies and computer-generated noise. Within a year they travelled to play in German clubs which resulted in a positive response. The Beangrowers record heavily in English but they are possibly best known in the German-speaking world. In 1999 their first single made the top 20 of the Deutsche Alternative Charts, an alternative rock sales ranking in Germany. They also have become a minor hit in New Zealand where the single "José Clemente" from their album Beangrowers reached No. 7 on New Zealand charts and achieved steady rotation on Juice TV, the New Zealand equivalent of MTV. Relatively obscure in large English-speaking markets, various critics have voiced their opinion that they would do very well in Britain and the United States if more popularly known..

Their song, The Priest, has been featured on the soundtrack of Wim Wenders  2004 movie Land of Plenty featuring Michelle Williams.

Alison has also lent her voice to the Academy Award Wim Wenders soundtrack for the film Pina 2011, the biopic on the contemporary dance choreographer Pina Bausch.

They have recently worked on the soundtrack for the movie Love Me (2012) by Rick Bota.

Musical style

Musically the group is influenced by other alternative groups like the Violent Femmes, Joy Division, and the Pixies, but with an alternative pop sound. The band itself readily admits to this noting that "all the greats essentially wrote pop songs, like The Cure, Nirvana, Depeche Mode etc." Many of Beangrowers songs, such as "Teen Titans" with repeating lyrics "We never listen to the radio" seem to reference the band's own obscure indie status.

Discography

Albums
48K, June 1999 - Review
Beangrowers, April 2001  - Review
Dance Dance Baby, October 2004 - Review
Not In A Million Lovers, April 2008 - Review 1 2

Singles
Astroboy, March 1999
Genzora, July 1999
Jose Clemente, 1999 (New Zealand only)
Feel, May 2000
Teen Titans, April 2001
This Year's Love, 2002
You Are You Are, October 2004
I Like You, January 2006  (UK only)
Not In A Million Lovers, April 2008

References

External links
 Official Beangrowers Webpage
 German Beangrowers Site
Beangrowers on MySpace.com
Beangrowers on CDbaby.com

Maltese alternative rock groups
Musical groups established in 1999
1999 establishments in Malta